Anzhelika Glazkova (born 28 December 1968, Kostroma) is a Russian political figure and a deputy of the 8th State Duma.
 
Glazkova worked at a design institute in Kostroma and at the tax office. She was an accountant in the field of thermal power engineering in Kostroma. In 2006 Glazkova moved to Moscow. From 2006 to 2019, she worked as a chief accountant of the Moscow United Energy Company. She also worked as an advisor to Yury Afonin. Since September 2021, she has served as deputy of the 8th State Duma.

References
 

 

1968 births
Living people
Communist Party of the Russian Federation members
21st-century Russian politicians
Eighth convocation members of the State Duma (Russian Federation)
21st-century Russian women politicians
People from Kostroma